Abd Allāh ibn ʿUmar may refer to:

 Abd Allah ibn Umar ibn Makhzum (died late 5th-century), chief of the Banu Makhzum and father of al-Mughira ibn Abd Allah
 Abd Allah ibn Umar ibn al-Khattab (died 693), a son of caliph Umar
 Abd Allah ibn Umar ibn Abd al-Aziz (died 750), a son of caliph Umar II

See also 
 Abd Allah ibn Amr: the name Amr is sometimes conflated with Umar.